GU10 is a triple CD 10th anniversary release from Global Underground Ltd. celebrating their Global Underground series.  Discs 1 and 2 feature tracks from the past ten years whereas the third features tracks produced from earlier.  Aside from the standard three CD package, there is also a three LP edition as well as a special limited edition which features a bonus unmixed fourth disc.

Track listing

Disc one
Underworld - Two Months Off
Laurent Garnier - Man With The Red Face (Jan Driver Mix)
Fatboy Slim - Sunset (Bird Of Prey)
Pascal F.E.O.S. - I Can Feel That
Jark Prongo - Movin Thru Your System
Alex Dolby - Psiko Garden
Albion - Air
Libra Presents Taylor - Anomaly (Calling Your Name)
Polaroid - So Damn Beautiful (Amethyst Mix)
Pako - Steel Blue (GUX 2006 Re-Edit)
Gipsy - I Trance You (Pappa & Gilbey Mix)
Planisphere - Deep Blue Dream/PQM - You Are Sleeping (Acappella)
PQM - You Are Sleeping (Luke Chable Vocal Pass)
Private Productions - Sexdrive (M & B's Instructor Mix)
Chable & Bonnici - Ride (Mashtronic Remix)
Felix Da Housecat - Silver Screen Shower Scene (Thin White Duke Remix)
Steve Lawler - Rise In (Original Vocal Mix)
Billie Ray Martin - Honey (Deep Dish Hoojee Dub)
Layo & Bushwacka! - Let The Good Times Roll
Ian Brown - F.E.A.R. (UNKLE Remix)

Disc two
Dark Globe - Break My World
Lustral - Everytime (Nalin & Kane Remix)
Sander Kleinenberg - Sacred (Dub)
Alcatraz - Give Me Luv (That Kid Chris Tribute Mix)
Breeder - Sputnik (New York FM Mix)
Cass & Slide - Perception
Space Manoeuvres - Stage One (Pariah Mix)/(Total Separation Mix)
Lostep - The Roots
The Forth - Reality Detached (K Roxx 06 Separation Mix)
Miss Kittin & The Hacker - Frank Sinatra
Moonface - Overactive
KC Flightt vs. Funky Junction - Voices (Pete Heller Mix)
Pete Lazonby - Sacred Cycles (Jens Mahlstedt Mix)/(Quivver Mix)/(Original Mix)
Talisman & Hudson - Leaving Planet Earth (GUX 2006 Re-Edit)
Danny Tenaglia - Turn Me On (Bedrock Mix)
Tilt - I Dream (Tilt's Resurrection Mix)/(Casa De Angeles Mix)

Disc three
Slam - Eterna
The Beloved -  Your Love Takes Me Higher (Chillum Willum Mix)
Uncle Bob - Uncle Bob's Burly House
280 West - Scattered Dreams (Boom Chocka-Boom Mix)
The Reese Project - Colour Of Love (Deep Reese Mix)
De Melero - Night Moves (En El Calor De La Noche Mix)/De Melero's Groove/Night Moves (Moniapella)
Double FM - The Sound Of Amnesia (Amnesia Mix)
Andronicus  -Make You Whole (Freashly Squeezed Mix)
Alfredo - Inspiration (0224 Mix)
Furry Phreaks - Gonna Find A Way (Major Dude Mix)
The Good Men - Make Up Your Mind
Coco Steel & Lovebomb - Feel It
Band In A Box - Get Dynamite
Egma - Let The Bass Kick
Mental Cube - Q (Santa Monica Mix)
Reese & Santonio - Rock To The Beat
Ralphi Rosario - You Used to Hold Me
Rejuvenation - I.B.O.
Caspar Pound - Fever Called Love (Ambient Mix)
LFO - LFO (The Leeds Warehouse Mix)
SAS - Amber Groove (Toxic Hijack Remix)
Sublime - The Theme
S.S.R. - To Be House
Play Boys - Mindgames (You Keep Playing Guitar)
Salt City Orchestra - The Book (Bookin' Da Beats)
Slacker - Scared (The Lonely Traveller)
PKA - Temperatures Rising (Music For The Masses)
Sasha & Maria - Be As One

External links 

Feature on Progressive-Sounds

Global Underground
2006 compilation albums